Kirpal Singh Bhardwaj (9 September 1935 – 10 November 2013) was a Kenyan field hockey player. He competed at the 1960 Summer Olympics and the 1968 Summer Olympics.

References

External links
 

1935 births
2013 deaths
Kenyan male field hockey players
Olympic field hockey players of Kenya
Field hockey players at the 1960 Summer Olympics
Field hockey players at the 1968 Summer Olympics
People from Tororo District
Sportspeople from Nairobi
Panjab University alumni
Kenyan people of Indian descent
Kenyan people of Punjabi descent
Kenyan emigrants to the United Kingdom
British sportspeople of Indian descent
British people of Punjabi descent